Al-Nu'man II ibn al-Aswad was the tenth Lakhmid king, reigning in 497–503 AD. His mother was Umm al-Mulk bint 'Amr ibn Hajar al-Kindi, the sister of al-Harith ibn 'Amru, the celebrated Kindite prince.

References
 

503 deaths
5th-century monarchs in the Middle East
6th-century monarchs in the Middle East
Lakhmid kings
Monarchs killed in action
Year of birth unknown
5th-century Arabs
6th-century Arabs
Vassal rulers of the Sasanian Empire